Arthur Barrow (19 July 1897 – 19 July 1943) was an English cricketer. He played for Gloucestershire in 1919.

References

1897 births
1943 deaths
English cricketers
Gloucestershire cricketers
Sportspeople from Cheltenham